Rasheed Olawale Lawal (born 13 August 1983) is a Nigerian amateur boxer who qualified for the 2008 Olympics in the lightweight division.

At the 2007 All-Africa Games he lost to Herbert Nkabiti at junior welterweight and went down a division. He finished second at the 2nd AIBA African 2008 Olympic Qualifying Tournament after defeating  Julius Indongo and losing the final to fellow qualifier Jean de Dieu Soloniaina . At the Olympics he was shut out 0:12 by Armenian Hrachik Javakhyan.

[[Marriage -
Rebekah Lawal 04 May 2015 ;Ventura California]].

References
sports-reference

Olympic boxers of Nigeria
Living people
Lightweight boxers
1983 births
Commonwealth Games competitors for Nigeria
Boxers at the 2006 Commonwealth Games
Boxers at the 2008 Summer Olympics
Nigerian male boxers
Competitors at the 2007 All-Africa Games
African Games competitors for Nigeria